Colin Blumenau (born London, 7 August 1956) is a British writer and theatre director. He is the son of Tom Blumenau OBE and Eva Blumenau, both founder members of Amnesty International. He is the Artistic Director of The Production Exchange.

During his early career as an actor he came to public notice playing Francis "Taffy" Edwards in The Bill between 1984 and 1990. After leaving the programme having appeared in more than 150 episodes he turned his hand to theatre management. He was variously Artistic Director of The Angles Theatre in Wisbech [1991-1993] and The Brewhouse Theatre & Arts Centre in Taunton [1993-1996].

He was Artistic Director of the Theatre Royal, Bury St Edmunds between 1996 and 2012 and spearheaded its restoration project. During this period, under the banner of Restoring the Repertoire, he also led the Theatre Royal's initiative to rediscover and restore the much neglected English Drama repertoire of the 18th and early 19th centuries to the stage. Productions included Black-Eyed Susan by Douglas Jerrold, Wives as they Were and Maids as they Are by Elizabeth Inchbald, The London Merchant by George Lillo and the world premiere of Inchbald's The Massacre two centuries after it was written. In addition there were public readings of some seventy five plays by authors as  diverse as Hannah Cowley and John le Planché,

Since 2012 he has resumed a freelance career as well as being the Artistic Director of The Production Exchange a theatre production charity whose objective is to provide support, mentoring and opportunities for early-career practitioners in Theatre and Dance. The current Chair is Angela Smith, Baroness Smith of Basildon.

Under the pseudonym of Daniel O'Brien he is a prolific writer of work for the stage and his pantomime scripts are performed annually in a number of theatres notably at The Riverfront Arts Centre in Newport, Wales and the Theatre Royal, Wakefield.

In 2020, Blumenau shared his memories of working on the first three series of The Bill for the book Witness Statements. He has also recorded two Video Commentaries for The Bill Podcast Patreon Channel, where he was also reunited with eight of his Sun Hill co-stars for a three-part Zoom reunion.

In 2021, Blumenau returned to television acting, guest-starring in an episode of EastEnders.

He is married to Casting Director Debbie O'Brien and has three sons Dan, who works for Disney in Paris, academic Jack and Casting Director Harry.

External links
 Personal Website
 The Production Exchange Website
 Guardian review - Wives as they Were, Maids as they Are
 Guardian review - Black Eyed Susan

References

1956 births
Living people
British male television actors
Male actors from London
British theatre directors